The 2021–22 I-League (also known as Hero I-League for sponsorship reasons) was the 15th season of I-League, last as the top tier of Indian football league system, since its establishment in 2007. All the matches were hosted in a bio-secure bubble in West Bengal due to COVID-19 pandemic in India.

After the commencement of the first match-week of the league on 27 December 2021, the tournament got suspended on 29 December due to reports of numerous COVID-19 cases among the players and staff. All India Football Federation released new dates on 1 February 2022, with a revised schedule of the league resuming from 3 March.

The AIFF allowed spectators in the second phase of the league. On final matchday, with only a draw needed, Gokulam Kerala defeated Mohammedan by 2–1 to successfully defend the title, becoming the first team to do so in I-League and first time in 14 years to do so in the Indian football league's history.

Changes from last season

Number of clubs
The total number of clubs participating increased from 11 in the previous season to 13 in this season.

In 2020 the AIFF issued an invitation to accept bids for new clubs from non I-League cities, like Delhi, Gangtok, Ranchi, Jaipur, Jodhpur, Mangalore, Bhopal, Lucknow, Kanpur, Ahmedabad and Calicut among many others, to join the league from 2020 onwards. The invitation mentioned that the entity which wins the bid will be granted the right to own and operate a new football club. On 12 August 2020, the AIFF announced that Sreenidi Deccan, which is based in Visakhapatnam would join from this season.

On 4 December 2021, the AIFF replaced Chennai City by Kenkre.

Promoted clubs
Promoted from the 2021 I-League Qualifiers
 Rajasthan United
 Kenkre

Relegated clubs
Relegated from the 2020–21 I-League
None

Notes:

Format
Due to the COVID-19 pandemic, the tournament's format was shortened last season, and the same format is being followed. All teams will face each other once in the first leg of the league, then they will be divided into two different groups. According to points table from first leg, top seven teams will face each other once again in the Championship stage, where the team with most points (cumulative points collected from all seventeen matches) will be declared the winner of the league and qualify for the Playoffs for 2023–24 AFC Cup group stage. The other six teams will play against each other in a Relegation stage where the team with the lowest points (cumulative points collected from all sixteen matches) will be relegated to 2nd Division League.

Teams

Stadiums and locations
AIFF declared West Bengal as the venue for the second straight season on 26 June, with all matches being played at Kalyani Stadium in Kalyani and Naihati Stadium in Naihati. The final match of the league was later rescheduled to be hosted at Vivekananda Yuba Bharati Krirangan.

Personnel and sponsorship

Head coaching changes

Transfers

Foreign players

Note: Players in bold has senior international cap(s) for their respective nations.

AIFF allowed maximum of six foreign players including one from AFC-affiliated country per team but only four can be part of matchday squad. Indian Arrows cannot sign any foreign player as they are part of AIFF's developmental program.

Phase 1

Standings

Fixtures and results 
All matches were played at neutral venues. The "home" and "away" are designated to identify Team 1 and Team 2 respectively.

Positions by round

Results by games

Phase 2

Championship stage (Group A)

Relegation stage (Group B)

Fixtures and results 
All matches were played at neutral venues. The "home" and "away" are designated to identify Team 1 and Team 2 respectively.

Positions by round

Results by games

Final standings

Season statistics

Top scorers
As of 15 May 2022
Note: Only top 10 goalscorers of the season has been listed below.

Top assists
As of 14 May 2022
Note: Only top 3 assist providers have been listed below.

Hat-tricks
Note: The score of the player's team is displayed first in the result column.

Clean sheets
As of 14 May 2022
Note: Only top 5 goalkeepers with most cleansheets have been listed below.

Discipline

Player
 Most yellow cards: 7
 Mauro dos Santos (Rajasthan United)

 Most red cards: 2
 Robert Primus (Aizawl)

Club
 Most yellow cards: 35
Churchill Brothers

 Most red cards: 5
Real Kashmir

Awards

 Match 1 - 78 = First phase
 Match 79 - 114 = Second phase

Hero of the Match

Season awards

See also
 2021–22 Indian Super League season
 2021–22 in Indian football
 2021 Durand Cup
 2021 IFA Shield

References

 
I-League seasons
1
India
2021–22 in Indian football